Choeromorpha pigra is a species of beetle in the family Cerambycidae. It was described by Chevrolat in 1843. It is known from Sumatra.

References

Choeromorpha
Beetles described in 1843